Sandford Orcas is a village and parish in northwest Dorset, England,  north of Sherborne. In the 2011 census the parish had a population of 180. Just to the east of the village itself is the hamlet of Holway. The village lies in hilly country on the Dorset/Somerset county border, and was part of Somerset until 1896, with the land connected to the Abbot of Glastonbury.

The poetic-sounding village name has a more prosaic explanation. Three streams rise in the parish and in Saxon times, the water was forded over a sandy riverbed from which the name Sandford derives. The 'Orcas' descends from the Norman Orescuilz family, who came to own the village manor in the century after the Battle of Hastings in 1066. The village was known as Sanford in 1086 (in the Domesday Book), Sandford in 1243, Sandford Horscoys in 1372, and Samford Orescoys in 1427. The present manor house goes back five hundred years to the Tudors, it has changed little since.

The parish was part of the hundred of Horethorne.

Adjacent to the manor house is the Perpendicular church of Saint Nicholas, which has a 13th-century font, shaped like an upturned Canterbury bell flower. In the south chapel is a wall monument of carved and painted alabaster, showing a knight in armour kneeling between his two wives and eleven children. Seven children kneel, in black gowns and the others are in swaddling clothes of red and lying in a heap behind their mother. The knight, who rests below the memorial is William Knoyle. The reading on the stone gives information on this tomb dated 1607. It seems he married 'Fillip, daughter of Robert Morgane...by whome hee had yssve 4 children & bee dead'. The knight's second wife was Grace Clavel, by whom he had three sons and four daughters, who survived him.

References

External links

Villages in Dorset
Places formerly in Somerset